The Millard Public Schools is a school district in the southwest part of Omaha, Nebraska, United States. The first school in Millard was established in the fall of 1870. The school district is named for Ezra Millard (1833-1886), who platted Millard, a mostly uninhabited prairie 12 miles southwest of the city. The former city of Millard was annexed by the City of Omaha in 1971 after a lengthy legal battle. Today the Millard School District has diverse programs such as Nebraska's only K-12 International Baccalaureate program, offered at Millard North High school, Millard North Middle School, Aldrich Elementary, and Black Elk Elementary.  The district also offers the Core Academy and Montessori, as well as many other programs.

Thirteen Millard schools have earned the Blue Ribbon Award from the U.S. Department of Education. Kiplinger's Magazine cited the "top-rated, nationally recognized" Millard School District as one of the reasons Omaha rated No. 3 in the list of the Top 10 Best Cities for 2008.

Millard is the third largest district in Nebraska.  The district currently has four high schools: Millard North High School, Millard West High School, Millard South High School, and Keith Lutz Horizon High School.

Attendance area
Within Douglas County, the district includes portions of Omaha and Boys Town.

The district extends into Sarpy County, where the district includes sections of Chalco and La Vista.

Middle schools (grades 6-8)
 Andersen Middle School
 Beadle Middle School
 Central Middle School
 Peter Kiewit Middle School
 Millard North Middle School
 Russell Middle School

High schools (grades 9-12)
 Millard North High School
 Millard South High School
 Millard West High School
 Keith Lutz Horizon High School

Elementary schools (K-grade 5)

 Ackerman
 Bess Streeter Aldrich
 Black Elk
 Bryan
 Cather
 Cody
 Cottonwood
 Disney
 Ezra Millard
 Grace Abbott
 Harvey Oaks
 Hitchcock
 Holling Heights
 Montclair
 Morton
 Neihardt
 Norris
 Reagan 
 Reeder
 Rockwell
 Rohwer
 Sandoz
 Upchurch
 Wheeler
 Willowdale

Willowdale
Willowdale enrolls about 405 students and is notable for its website, WillowWeb, which features blogs, photos, and announcements. Radio WillowWeb is a podcast produced by Willowdale students and teachers. It was the first podcast by an elementary school in the United States and covers a range of educational topics.

See also
 List of public schools in Omaha, Nebraska

References

External links
 MPS website

Education in Omaha, Nebraska
Education in Sarpy County, Nebraska
School districts in Nebraska
West Omaha, Nebraska
1870 establishments in Nebraska
School districts established in 1870
School districts of Omaha, Nebraska
Millard Public Schools